Ferrarisia is a genus of fungi in the family Parmulariaceae.

The genus name of Ferrarisia is in honour of Teodoro Ferraris (1874 - 1943), who was an Italian botanist, Professor of Botany and Plantpathologist in Alba in 1909.

The genus was circumscribed by Pier Andrea Saccardo in Atti Accad. Veneto-Trent. series 3, Vol.10 on page 61 in 1919.

Species
Ferrarisia apiahyna
Ferrarisia capparis
Ferrarisia eugeniae
Ferrarisia ipomoeae
Ferrarisia jasmini
Ferrarisia litseae
Ferrarisia pamellisiae
Ferrarisia pavettae
Ferrarisia philippina
Ferrarisia quercina

References

External links
Ferrarisia at Index Fungorum

Parmulariaceae